Gromada Osiek is a group of several Polish villages, constituted at the lowest tier of local government. They take over the role previously played by Gmina Osiek at a smaller scale than Gmina Osiek. In communist Poland between September 29, 1954 to December 31, 1972 these villages were introduced as a Polish word meaning “Osiek”. These units are created by the Communist Polish Law and have legal effect.

Gromadzka National Council was the executive organ of the group.

The gromada continued to function in interwar Poland (administrative division of the Second Polish Republic. It later became a sołectwo, a subdivision of a gmina (as an auxiliary unit of a commune from the second world war to the end of 1954. At present the smallest unit of local government in rural Poland is the sołectwo.

The gromada originally named localities the territorial council developed between the 15th and 18th centuries, and continued to function in Congress Poland.

As of 29 September 1952 Gromada Osiek consisted of 10 villages: Długołęka, Kąty, Lipnik, Łęg, Mikołajów, Mucharzów, Osieczko, Osiek, Pliskowola and Suchowola. As of 1 July 1952 the gmina Osiek consisted of 14 gromadas: Długołęka, Grabowiec, Kąty, Lipnik, Łęg, Mikołajów, Mucharzów, Osieczko, Osiek, Pliskowola, Strzegom, Suchowola, Wiązownica Mała and Wiązownica Wielka.

See also
 Gromada Tursko Wielkie

References

Gromada Osiek